Billy J. Mitchell (June 16, 1942 – 1999) was an American character actor based in the United Kingdom. He was known for portraying North American characters in British-based productions like Superman (1978), Top Secret! (1984), and GoldenEye (1995).

Mitchell died in 1999 aged 56 or 57 in England. He never married and had no children.

Filmography

Cinema 
 Carry On England (1976) – Gunner Childs
 Superman (1978) – 1st Editor (Daily Planet)
 Ragtime (1981) – Delmas' Assistant No. 2
 Star Wars: Episode VI - Return of the Jedi (1983) – Keir Santage (Red Seven) (uncredited)
 The Lonely Lady (1983) – Gross
 Never Say Never Again (1983) – Captain Pederson
 Top Secret! (1984) – Martin
 Morons from Outer Space (1985) – Alaska Space Monitoring Unit Commander (uncredited)
 Rustler's Rhapsody (1985) – Town Doctor
 Death Wish 3 (1985) – Fraker's Lawyer
 Haunted Honeymoon (1986) – Cop No. 1
 Bird (1988) – Prince
 Who Framed Roger Rabbit (1988) – Forensic No. 2
 Indiana Jones and the Last Crusade (1989) – Dr. Mulbray 
 Bullseye! (1990) – Elmer, Tourist
 Malcolm X (1992) – Man No. 1
 GoldenEye (1995) – Admiral Chuck Farrell
 What Rats Won't Do (1998) – Diner on Boat
 A Year and a Day (2005) – Band Leader (final film role)

References

External links
 

1942 births
1999 deaths
American emigrants to England
American expatriate male actors in the United Kingdom